18 Mart Çan power station (also known as Çan power station) is a coal-fired power station in Turkey in Çan, which burns lignite mined locally and belongs to the state power company. It was shut down in March 2021 but reopened after a flue-gas desulfurization system was installed at a cost of US$45.9 million.

In June 2021 İklim Değişikliği Politika ve Araştırma Derneği (Climate Change Policy and Research Association) said the plant should be shut down for operating without an environmental permit.

References

External links 

 18 Mart Çan power station on Global Energy Monitor

Coal-fired power stations in Turkey